Pitseng is a village in Botswana. It lies between Jwaneng and Moshupa in the Southern District. The population of Pitseng was 2250 in 2001.  The current village chief (Kgosi) is Mmolotsinyana Mafhoko.
The village has a primary school called by the name of the village. There is a main kgotla and a small clinic.

References

Villages in Botswana